Melanthripidae is a family of thrips belonging to the order Thysanoptera.

Genera:
 Ankothrips Crawford, 1909
 †Archankothrips Priesner, 1924
 Cranothrips Bagnall, 1915
 Dorythrips Hood, 1931
 †Eocranothrips Bagnall, 1927
 †Gymnopollisthrips Peñalver, Nel & Nel, 1927
 Melanthrips Haliday, 1836
 †Proboscisthrips Ulitzka, 2017

References

Thrips